John Francis "Jack" Roche (September 6, 1927 – January 26, 1956) was an American serial killer, burglar, and rapist who murdered at least four people in the Yorkville neighborhood of Eastern Manhattan between 1953 and 1954. Following his arrest, Roche admitted responsibility in two more murders that other people had already been convicted of, resulting in one of those convictions being overturned. For the murder of 14-year-old Dorothy Westwater, Roche was convicted, sentenced to death, and subsequently executed at Sing Sing in 1956.

Early life 
John Francis Roche was born on September 6, 1927, in Port Chester, New York, one of three children to Irish immigrant parents. Shortly after his birth, the family moved from Port Chester and settled in New York City. Roche's father Patrick was an alcoholic who repeatedly assaulted his wife and at one point attempted suicide. Roche's mother made money by working as a prostitute in a tenement flat. According to psychological reports, Roche would spend a considerable amount of time in confinement. At age 12, Roche began committing petty crimes, many of which landed him on probation. At age 13, he was sent to a reformatory school. In his adolescent years, his mother abandoned him, and Roche began escalating his crimes. In 1951 he was detained for armed robbery, for which he was given a short prison term, getting out sometime before July 1952.

Murders 
Roche might have started his murder spree on July 26, 1952, when 23-year-old Josephine Brown was strangled to death on a deserted street in Queens. For her murder, police arrested 18-year-old Oliver L. Freeman, known to police as "The Batman", and he was convicted of first-degree manslaughter for Josephine Brown's death and was sentenced to 10 to 20-years imprisonment. On August 22, 1953, 22-year-old sailor Edward Bates was bludgeoned and stabbed to death in Queens. Not long after, police began investigating Paul A. Pfeffer, a man with a lengthy criminal history, and he was arrested on August 27. On November 15, Roche burglarized an apartment that belonged to 85-year-old Rosa Chronik. Investigators allege that while he was ransacking the place, Rosa interrupted him, and in a panic Roche stabbed her to death and fled. This murder was Roche's first confirmed. Paul Pfeffer, on the other hand, was convicted of Bates' murder in January 1954, and he was sentenced to 20-years imprisonment.

Roche did not commit another murder until April 8, 1954. That day, he stalked 17-year-old Marion Brown through the apartment complex she lived in and where she worked as a waitress. Once in a secluded area of a hallway, Roche attacked Brown and proceeded to rape her, while Brown attempted to scream for help, but Roche eventually killed her and fled. After the murder, Roche got a call from his fiancée, Yolande Graspo. Graspo exclaimed she was frightened at the news of Brown's murder and wanted Roche to walk her home, unknown to her that Roche was the killer. Roche agreed to lead Graspo home, and he did, leaving her unharmed.

On April 16, Roche flagged down a taxi operated by 43-year-old Alexander Jablonka. Once inside, Roche stabbed Jablonka to death with the same knife used to kill Brown, and fled. During the period of time after the murder, there was speculation that the murders of Brown and Jablonka were perpetrated by the same person, something the Yorkville police denied, saying there was not enough evidence and the news could cause a panic among Yorkville residents. On June 2, 14-year-old Dorothy Westwater left her apartment for school when Roche approached and forcefully dragged her under a staircase. He proceeded to stab Westwater in the neck, back, and chest a total of eight times, before raping her and shattering her skull with a lead pipe. By the time Westwater was found she was still alive but in dreadful condition, having to be rushed to the hospital, where she died as a result of her injuries.

Investigation 
The series of brutal slayings caused a moral panic among the Yorkville population, with authorities overwhelmed with the string of murders, finally having to admit that there was a link between each of the killings. It was reported that men in the general area of the murders accompanied young girls to protect them from the killer. On June 5, 1954, Roche was arrested by patrolman Gustave Roniger. Roniger noticed Roche driving erratically on the wrong side of the road, and so he pulled him over. Roche could not produce a driver's license and so he was arrested and booked to the closest police station. When asked what he was doing, Roche simply replied "Just for a pleasant day." Once in custody, the license plate on the vehicle matched that of a vehicle that was reported stolen. In the trunk of the vehicle police uncovered a knife and a blood stain on a lead pipe, which investigators involved in Westwater's murder were made aware about. Roche was interrogated and confessed to a total of six murders, including those of Edward Bates and Josephine Brown. Two days after Roche's arrest, an 18-year-old black boy named Norman Roye was arrested in New York City for the murder of his neighbor 66-year-old Isadora Goomes. Roye eventually confessed to three murders that dated back to January 1954. Due to the close proximity and the timing, the press and news outlets compared Roche and Roye together on a daily basis.

Trial 
Since two of Roche's murder confessions involved the convictions of two people, an outcry of public support for both Oliver Freeman and Paul Pfeffer to stand a re-trial. Queens County District Attorney Vincent Quinn stated however that Roche's confessions were "without basis in fact", and said four out of the six murders he confessed to held actual truth. Despite this, a re-trial of Paul Pfeffer was granted, but Roche was due to stand trial for the murder of Dorothy Westwater first. During the trial, Roche did not deny his guilt, claiming he did not want to live out the rest of his days in prison and wanted to die. He also claimed he was sorry for killing Westwater, claiming he thought she was 18 when he attacked her, but was upset to learn she was 14. Roche's attorney James Murray compared Roche's mind to scrambled eggs, saying his client was insane. Roche stated he would rather be executed than be sent to a mental hospital. 

Roche expressed some remorse over Westwater's murder due to her age, saying "I am sorry . . . she was only 14. I thought she was 18." Roche was convicted of first-degree murder. The jury did not recommend mercy, making a death sentence mandatory. His execution was scheduled for August 24, 1955. However, Roche was unable to be executed that day due to testify at the retrial of Paul Pfeffer. Before the trial, Pfeffer was convicted of a separate homicide, that of Mellon Byrd, and an assault on Harry Meyer, for which he was sentenced to life in prison. In January 1956, the charge against Pfeffer for Bates’ murder was dismissed.

Execution  
On January 26, 1956, Roche was finally executed at Sing Sing, by the electric chair. His last meal consisted of fried chicken, french fries, potatoes, tomato salad, strawberry shortcake, rolls, ice cream, coffee, and cigarettes. Roche had no last words. Roche met with a chaplain in the hours before he was put to death.

Before his execution, Roche said he hadn't killed Bates, and only said so out of sympathy for Pfeffer since they both "had seamy lives". Pfeffer, who was serving time for the murder of Mellon Byrd, was paroled on November 27, 1972.

See also 
 Norman Roye
 Capital punishment in New York (state)
 List of people executed in New York
 List of serial killers in the United States

References 

1927 births
1956 deaths
20th-century American criminals
20th-century executions by New York (state)
American male criminals
American murderers of children
American rapists
Crime in New York (state)
Criminals from New York (state)
Executed American serial killers
Executed people from New York (state)
Male serial killers
People convicted of murder by New York (state)
People executed by New York (state) by electric chair
People from Port Chester, New York